Jacqueline Bryony Lucy ‘Jackie’ Pullinger, MBE (born 1944) is a British Protestant Christian charismatic  missionary to Hong Kong and founder of the St Stephen's Society. She has been ministering in Hong Kong since 1966. The early years of her Hong Kong ministry are chronicled in the book Chasing the Dragon (1980).

History
Pullinger graduated from the Royal College of Music in London having specialized in the oboe. At the age of 22 she wanted to be a missionary, so she wrote to various missionary organizations. Unable to find support from missionary organizations, she then sought advice from Richard Thomson, a minister. At first she wanted to go to Africa, but then she had a dream that impressed upon her the idea of going to Hong Kong. She followed the vicar's advice and went to Hong Kong by boat in 1966. However, when she arrived she knew no one there and had only $10 on hand. The only reason the immigration officers allowed her in was because her mother's godson was a police officer there. She found work as a primary school teacher in the Kowloon Walled City, which in the 1960s was not policed and consequently had become one of the world's largest opium producing centres, run by Chinese criminal Triad gangs. Later she established a youth centre that helped the drug addicts and street sleepers inside the walled city. She also taught music at St. Stephen's Girls' College.

St Stephen's Society

In 1981, she started a charity called the St Stephen's Society which provided rehabilitation homes for recovering drug addicts, prostitutes, and gang members. By December 2007 it housed 200 people. The charity's work was recognized by the Hong Kong government who donated the land for the rehabilitation homes. The work continues.

Published works

References

External links
rejesus - the story: Jackie Pullinger
St Stephen's Society Website
 http://www.scmp.com/lifestyle/article/2048647/britons-50-years-helping-hong-kong-addicts-beat-drugs-and-find-god

1944 births
English Protestant missionaries
Members of the Order of the British Empire
Protestant missionaries in China
Female Christian missionaries
Living people
Alumni of the Royal College of Music
English Charismatics
English evangelicals
Christian missionaries in Hong Kong
Christian medical missionaries
People from Croydon